Tigtone is an American adult animated television series that premiered on Adult Swim on January 14, 2019. It is based on the original characters of an independent short, The Begun of Tigtone, created by Andrew Koehler, Benjamin Martian, and Zack Wallenfang. They produced it through their own company Babyhemyth Productions.

The series was created by Andrew Koehler and Benjamin Martian and produced by Babyhemyth Productions with other two companies, Titmouse, Inc. and Williams Street. The setting is a parody of clichés and tropes from the medieval fantasy genre, with occasional steampunk references.

A second season was announced in July 2019. On August 13, 2020, it was announced that the second season would premiere on September 14, 2020.

In August 2021, Benjamin Martian announced that Adult Swim cancelled the series after two seasons.

Plot
In a medieval world, Tigtone is an intense and high-strung adventurer with a penchant for the over-dramatic and a murderous obsession for quests. He resides in the surreal, medieval kingdom of Propecia, ruled by its two-headed conjoined twin monarchs, King-Queen, who is regularly flanked by their effeminate man-child son Prince Lavender and their frequently put-upon attendant Command-Or Mathis. Joined by his trusty and expendable companion Helpy, Tigtone regularly accepts tasks and assignments that take him to various locations in Propecia, slaughtering numerous enemies along the way.

Characters

Main characters
 Tigtone (voiced by Nils Frykdahl as an adult, Cree Summer as a child) - The primary protagonist, a wandering adventurer with an obsession for quests.
 Helpy (voiced by Debi Derryberry) - An unspecified creature and Tigtone's companion whose regenerative powers make them regularly exploited and abused, even after becoming friends with Tigtone. In the finale of the first season, Helpy was revealed to have used Tigtone's quests to gather items needed for their master The Greater Good,only to subsequently be betrayed by The Greater Good and make amends with Tigtone.
 King-Queen (King voiced by Bill Corbett and Queen voiced by Lucy Davis) - The two-headed ruler of Propecia. One head is a male who is a king and the other head is a female who is a queen. In season two, it was revealed that the queen half of King-Queen had an affair with the late Amothedeus which led to Lavender killing the king half and send the queen half into exile. The queen half starts to hallucinate seeing her husband's ghost as she plans to reclaim her kingdom. In "Tigtone and the Stakes" upon Helpy getting the queen half to Propecia, the king half is revived by Lavendar as the king half apologizes to Lavendar for not being his real dad.
 Lore Mastra (voiced by Cree Summer) - The intense keeper of the royal library who often acts as a dispatcher for Tigtone's quests. She is prone to unpredictable fits of rage.
 Prince Lavender (voiced by Jeffrey Combs) - The man-child son of King-Queen. In the second season, Lavender finds out that his true father is the late Amothedeus making him a half-wizard leading to him killing the king half of King-Queen and driving the queen half into exile. He then collaborates with Spaceress in plots to take down Tigtone. By the end of the second season, Prince Lavender revives the king half of King-Queen while reconciling with his parents and maintaining his love for Spaceress.
 Command-Or Mathis (voiced by Trace Beaulieu) - The put-upon attendant of King-Queen, who frequently attempts to impress the monarch, but is constantly overshadowed by Tigtone's accomplishments. In "Tigtone and the Stakes," Mathis is turned to stone during the fight against Lavendar and Spaceress.

Recurring characters
 Memory Gnome (voiced by John DiMaggio in the pilot, Gary Anthony Williams in later episodes) - A gnome who dispenses advice to Tigtone through memories.
 Lord Festus (voiced by Sid Haig in the pilot, John DiMaggio in later episodes) - A recurring villain with a fetish for torturing people.
 Beconka (voiced by Cree Summer) - A wandering adventurer who becomes Tigtone's competitive rival.
 Spaceress (voiced by Maria Bamford) - An evil space villain who ends up on Tigtone's world at the start of the second season. She allies with Prince Lavendar and he falls in love with her. The episode "Tigtone and the Stakes" reveals that she is just an alien worm in a robotic armor.

Episodes

Precursor (2014)

Pilot (2018)

Season 1 (2019)

Season 2 (2020)

Shorts (2014–15, 2019, 2020)
In addition to the main episodes, there have been twelve Tigtone's Journal shorts released on Babyhemyth Productions' YouTube channel (like The Begun of Tigtone, these predated the television series), and eight Dear Journal shorts released on Adult Swim's YouTube channel. With the exceptions of Entries # 6, 8, 9, and 10 of Tigtone's Journal, which are slightly over a minute long, each has a runtime of less than one minute. As a promotion for Season 2, Adult Swim's YouTube channel released the short "Helpy's Useful Helpings," which is presented as an infomercial-like tutorial (note that the title for the YouTube posting is different than the video itself, which instead displays "Helpy's Useful Usings"). This short is over 3 minutes long.

References
Informational notes

Citations

External links
 

2010s American adult animated television series
2020s American adult animated television series
2019 American television series debuts
2020 American television series endings
Adult Swim original programming
American adult animated action television series
English-language television shows
Television series by Williams Street
Television series set in the Middle Ages